John Gerard Noonan (born February 26, 1951) is an Irish-born American prelate in the Roman Catholic Church. He has been serving as bishop of the Diocese of Orlando in Florida since 2010. Noonan previously served as an auxiliary bishop of the Archdiocese of Miami in Florida from 2005 to 2010.

Biography

Early life
John Noonan was born in Limerick, Ireland, on February 26, 1951.  His parents were John Noonan and Margaret Purcell.  At age 18, John Noonan immigrated to New York, but later moved to Miami, Florida.  In 1979, Noonan graduated from St. John Vianney College Seminary in Westchester, Florida with a Bachelor of Arts degree. In 1983, he earned a Master of Divinity degree from St. Vincent de Paul Regional Seminary in Boynton Beach, Florida.

Ordination and ministry
On September 23, 1983, Noonan was ordained a priest for the Archdiocese of Miami at St. Paul of the Cross Church in North Palm Beach, Florida. He was then assigned as parochial vicar at St. Elizabeth of Hungary Parish in Pompano Beach, Florida, (1983–1989) while also serving as the chaplain for youth ministry in Broward County, Florida (1985–1987).

Noonan was appointed dean of men at St. John Vianney (1989–1993), then priest in residence at St. Rose of Lima Parish in Miami Shores, Florida (1993–1994). Noonan next became supervising principal at Monsignor Edward Pace High School in Miami Gardens, Florida, (1993–1994) and then supervising principal at St. Brendan High School in Miami (1994–1996). In 1996, Noonan earned a Master of Education degree from Boston College in Boston, Massachusetts.  Noonan served as rector/president of St. John Vianney from 1996 until 2005.

Auxiliary Bishop of Miami

On June 21, 2005, Noonan was appointed titular bishop of Bonusta and auxiliary bishop of the Archdiocese of Miami by Pope Benedict XVI.  On August 24, 2005, he was consecrated at the Cathedral of Saint Mary in Miami. Noonan's principal consecrator was Archbishop John Favalora and his co-consecrators were Bishop Agustin Alejo Roman Rodriguez and Bishop Felipe de Jesús Estévez.

Bishop of Orlando
On October 23, 2010,  Benedict XVI appointed Noonan as the fifth bishop of the Diocese of Orlando.  He was installed at Basilica of Mary, Queen of the Universe in Orlando on December 16, 2010. On August 13, 2014, an Orlando man filed a lawsuit against Noonan and the Diocese of Orlando.  The plaintiff claimed to have been sexually assaulted when he was an altar boy in Sanford, Florida by Father William Authenrieth between 1976 and 1978. On June 15, 2017, Noonan attended a memorial service at St. James Cathedral for victims of the Pulse nightclub shooting in Orlando.  He made these remarks:“We need to walk with and accompany everybody — there is no exception,  We treat everybody with dignity because they are made in the image and likeness of God and that’s what it’s all about.”On August 30, 2018, Noonan removed David Gillis, parochial administrator of the Our Savior Parish in Cocoa Beach, Florida. Gillis had been accused in a Pennsylvania investigation of sexual abuse of a minor years earlier.

See also

 Catholic Church hierarchy
 Catholic Church in the United States
 Historical list of the Catholic bishops of the United States
 List of Catholic bishops of the United States
 Lists of patriarchs, archbishops, and bishops

References

External links

 Diocese of Orlando Official website

Episcopal succession

 

21st-century Roman Catholic bishops in the United States
1951 births
Living people
Irish emigrants to the United States
17th-century German Roman Catholic bishops
Roman Catholic Archdiocese of Miami
Boston College alumni
Roman Catholic bishops of Orlando
St. Vincent de Paul Regional Seminary alumni